Data Toolbar is a Web scraping computer software add-on to the  Internet Explorer, Mozilla Firefox, and Google Chrome Web browsers that collects and converts structured data from Web pages into a tabular format that can be loaded into a spreadsheet or database management program.

Algorithm  
The program implements a variation of the genetic tree matching algorithm with respect to nested lists. That is, inside a given website, the program recursively traverses the branches of its DOM tree, aiming to detect nested lists of data items matching the format of the specified content.  This approach is known to have several advantages over a simple string-matching algorithm.

Features 
 Collection of data and images directly from the Internet Explorer
 Collection of information from Details pages linked to the catalog
 Automatic processing of multi-page catalogs
 Support of irregular multi-row catalogs mixed with advertisement

Similar tools 
 Automation Anywhere - The Web Extractor is a part of the larger automation system
 Easy Web Extract - Standalone application, Windows
 Mozenda - Web based service
 Newprosoft - Standalone application, includes an Agent, Windows
 OutWit – Standalone Application and Firefox Extension
 Data Scraping Studio – Standalone Application for Windows and Chrome Extension
 Diggernaut – Web platform with standalone application for Windows, Linux, MacOS and Google Chrome Extension

Sources

External links 
http://datatoolbar.com/
Internet Explorer add-ons
Web scraping